"Wokeuplikethis" (stylized as "wokeuplikethis*") is a song by American rapper Playboi Carti featuring vocals from fellow American rapper Lil Uzi Vert and production from Pi'erre Bourne. It was released on April 7, 2017, as the second single from Carti's eponymous debut commercial mixtape Playboi Carti (2017).

The song samples the 2004 single "White Tee" by fellow Atlanta rap group Dem Franchize Boyz.

Release
The song premiered via SoundCloud on March 10, 2017, and was released on the iTunes for digital download as a single on April 7, 2017.

Composition and lyrics
"Wokeuplikethis" is a trap song. Carti's verses have been described as "spilling out unfinished ideas, but there's a charm to the way he dawdles through verses, as if rap is merely an afterthought."

Music video
The song's official music video premiered exclusively on Tidal and was then later released on YouTube on August 7, 2017, with 83 million views as of February 2023. The video was directed by James “JMP” Pereira, who has directed videos such as "Look At Me" and "Moonlight" for XXXTentacion.

Synopsis
The video takes place in a prison, with the opening shot showing Carti getting a haircut shirtless by a woman in a red dress while lip syncing the lyrics on a rotary dial telephone. The rest of the video switches between shots of an exercise yard and a hallway with other prisoners imitating him.

Usage in media
 The song was sampled by Eminem for his track "Greatest" on Kamikaze.
 Beyoncé interpolated the song into her 2018 Coachella performance.
 The song was used in the video game NBA Live 18
 Lil Wayne remixed the song on his mixtape Dedication 6: Reloaded.

Charts

Weekly charts

Year-end charts

Certifications

References 

2017 singles
2017 songs
Playboi Carti songs
Lil Uzi Vert songs
Songs written by Playboi Carti
Songs written by Lil Uzi Vert
Songs written by Pi'erre Bourne
Interscope Records singles

Trap music songs